Cory Bomberry (born August 9, 1976) is an Iroquois lacrosse player who is currently a free agent. He played most recently for the Rochester Knighthawks of the National Lacrosse League. He spent his career as an attacker.

Bomberry can be considered one of the most famous and most popular Iroquois lacrosse players. Although he spent most of his NLL career in Rochester, he also well known for his tenure in Buffalo. What's more, his goal on Feb. 18, 2006 against Minnesota, assisted by Bandits star John Tavares, helped Tavares to tie Gary Gait's then-existing NLL Career Points Record.

NLL career
He was selected as a first-round pick of the Knighthawks in 1997. He entered the league as two-time winner of Mann Cup with the Six Nations Chiefs in 1995 and 1996. He played there from 1997 to 2003 and won the 1997 championship. He then left the team and spent one year in Arizona Sting and three years in Buffalo Bandits. In Buffalo, he also took part in the 2008 NLL Championship, which was his seventh trip to the finals. In 2009, it was reported, that Bomberry was returning to Knighthawks, but he was released after the season. 

During his 13 year pro career, he has twice been recognized by the Turtle Island News, leading native weekly newspaper in North America, as the winner of the National Lacrosse League Native American MVP Award.

International career
Bomberry also took part in number of major international events, including three World Indoor Lacrosse Championship in 2003, and 2007, and 2011. The Iroquois Nationals won silver medals in all three tournaments.

Statistics

References

External links
Stats at NLL.com

1976 births
Living people
Iroquois nations lacrosse players
Native American sportspeople
First Nations sportspeople